The 2012 USARL season was the second season of the USA Rugby League (USARL). The 2012 season was an 8-team competition with the addition of the Baltimore Blues and departure of the New Jersey Turnpike Titans. The season began on June 2, and ended with the Championship Final on August 25 in Boston, Massachusetts.  The Jacksonville Axemen completed the USARL's first perfect season, capturing the Axemen's first USARL Championship and second minor premiership.

Teams

Season table

Ladder progression

Numbers highlighted in green indicate that the team finished the round inside the top 4.
Numbers highlighted in blue indicates the team finished first on the ladder in that round.
Numbers highlighted in red indicates the team finished last place on the ladder in that round.

Regular season
The league played a single round-round schedule, plus one additional game per team. Teams qualified for the playoffs based on point differential, with a win counting for 2 points, a draw for 1, a loss for 0, and a forfeit for −2 (or greater).
All fixtures sourced from the USARL.

Round 1

Round 2

Round 3

Round 4

Round 5

Round 6

Round 7

Round 8

Playoffs
The playoffs consisted of a two-round single-elimination tournament in August. The season's top four teams competed in a semi-final round, with the two winners going on to the Championship Final. In the first round on August 11, the first-placed team hosted the fourth-placed, and the second-placed hosted the third-placed.

References

External links 
 Official website

USARL season
USA Rugby League
Seasons in American rugby league
2012 in American sports